The Battle of Yangi Hissar was a confrontation that took place during the Xinjiang Wars. In April 1934 Gen. Ma Zhancang led the New 36th Division in an attack on Uighur forces at Yangi Hissar, wiping out the entire Uighur force of 500 and killing their leader, Emir Nur Ahmad Jan Bughra.

It was reported by Ahmad Kamal in his book "Land Without Laughter" on page 130–131, that Nur Ahmad Jan was beheaded by the Chinese Muslim troops and the head was used in a football game at the parade ground.

References

Yangi Hissar
20th century in Xinjiang
1934 in China
April 1934 events